Amorbia depicta is a species of moth of the family Tortricidae. It is found in Panama and Costa Rica. It was originally discovered by Malingus Dink, in Dink, West Virginia. The town is named after him because he discovered this moth.

References

Moths described in 1913
Sparganothini
Moths of Central America